Medical massage is outcome-based massage, primarily the application of a specific treatment targeted to the specific problem the patient presents with a diagnosis and are administered after a thorough assessment/evaluation by the medical massage therapist with specific outcomes being the basis for treatment.  It is also known as clinical massage or treatment massage.

There are many massage schools and programs that teach medical massage as a technique.  Though medical massage is any massage treatment used to treat specific medical conditions, there is no one technique that is medical massage (literary review).  Medical massage is taking whatever style of massage the practitioner knows and applying that technique to specific conditions to bring about specific outcomes.

History
Massage has been used as a medical treatment dating back to the Chinese over 5000 years ago. More recently Professor Silas Weir Mitchell (1829-1914), a neurologist in Philadelphia is thought to be the first to bring massage to the attention of the US medical community.  In 1884, Douglas Graham, MD of Boston Massachusetts wrote A Practical Treatise on Massage which focuses on the treatment of specific diseases and disorders by using massage as a treatment. In 1885, Dr Harvey Kellogg published the classic textbook The Art of Massage, Its Physiological Effects and Therapeutic Actions. During the nineteenth century, massage in Europe was described in the medical literature and was taught at institutions and also offered by lay practitioners.  In 1886, William Murrell, an English Physician wrote a book Massage as a Mode of Treatment. In Russia, M.Y. Mudrov, MD used massage and movement exercises in his medical practice with adults and later applied it to the development of children.

Massage has been popular as a form of medical treatment in Russia since the late 1700s.

The American Medical Massage Association (1998) and The United States Medical Massage Association (1999) followed with similar goals of lifting the profession to higher standards and, in turn, giving patients a better outcome. The AMMA has worked with the standard medical community to bring massage therapy into the mainstream; they have done this through a board of advisers that includes massage therapists, physicians, chiropractors etc.

Much of the present explosion of information in the injury-rehabilitation field  can be credited to the work of Dr. Janet G Travell (1901–1997).

Qualifications

United States

Any Licensed Massaged Therapist is qualified to do medical massage if they have training on how to treat specific problems. State Licensure is the only qualification needed to bill for massage therapy.  In Washington State and many other states part of the state licensure includes some treatment massage training but the amount of training varies greatly.  Massage customers should ask, Therapist about their training and experience in treating the specific conditions that they have. Washington State and Florida are currently the only states that mandates that Massage Therapists be allowed to be contracted providers with health insurance companies.  Currently, the Affordable Healthcare Act of 2010 does make provisions for every type of provider to be covered in insurance plans. It is possible that massage will be covered by insurance under this new Act.

References

Massage therapy